is a Japanese animated dance film directed by Naoki Miyahara, produced by Toei Animation, written by Shūko Arai and starring Asami Seto, Shiori Izawa, Atsumi Tanezaki, Ari Ozawa, and Tomoyo Kurosawa. It was released in Japan by Toei on December 23, 2016.
A crowdfunding campaign for a sequel novella was launched on October 28, 2019. The goal was reached the following day. A crowdfunding campaign for a second novella was launched on December 7, 2020. The goal was reached on January 25, 2021.

Cast
 Asami Seto as Isumi Kominato
 Shiori Izawa as Aoi Hioka
 Atsumi Tanezaki as Konatsu Tomodate
 Ari Ozawa as Asahi Ōmichi
 Tomoyo Kurosawa as Saki Tsukui
 Marina Tanoue as Pocon
 Kaori Ishihara as Ruchia
 Kaede Hondo as Daren
 M.A.O as Adona
 Satomi Arai as Rufie
 Unshō Ishizuka as Elder
 Mika Kanai as Remy
 Azusa Tadokoro as Miharu Fukamachi
 Megumi Toda as Nana Mitsuhashi

Promotion
The film was announced in April 2015. A teaser trailer was released in March 2016.

Release
In March 2016, it was announced in the teaser that the film is scheduled for release in the winter of 2016. A trailer released in July 2016 announced that the film was scheduled for release in January 2017. Another trailer released in September 2016 announced that the film would be released on December 23, 2016.  It premiered across 221 theaters in Japan.

References

External links
 

2016 films
2016 anime films
Anime with original screenplays
Toei Animation films
Toei Company films
2010s dance films
Films featuring an all-female cast
Dance in anime and manga
Magical girl anime and manga
Isekai anime and manga